Dávid Richtárech (born 22 April 1996) is a Slovak footballer who plays as a midfielder for Dukla Banská Bystrica.

Club career

FK Senica
Richtárech made his Fortuna Liga debut for Senica against AS Trenčín on 23 July 2017.

References

External links
 FK Senica official club profile 
 
 Futbalnet profile 
 
 Eurofotbal profile 

1996 births
Living people
Slovak footballers
Association football midfielders
AS Trenčín players
FK Slovan Nemšová players
FK Inter Bratislava players
AFC Nové Mesto nad Váhom players
FK Senica players
FC ViOn Zlaté Moravce players
MFK Dukla Banská Bystrica players
3. Liga (Slovakia) players
2. Liga (Slovakia) players
Slovak Super Liga players
Sportspeople from Banská Bystrica